Li Siqi (born 30 August 1997) is a Chinese footballer currently playing as a midfielder or defender for Yanbian Longding.

Club career
Li Siqi would play for the Beijing Guoan youth team before being promoted to the senior team within the 2018 Chinese Super League season. The following season he would go abroad to join Serbian second tier football club Smederevo where he would make his professional debut on 9 November 2019 in a league game against Bačka in a 1-0 defeat.

Career statistics

References

External links

1997 births
Living people
Chinese footballers
Chinese expatriate footballers
Association football midfielders
Beijing Guoan F.C. players
FK Smederevo players
FK Inđija players
Chinese Super League players
Serbian First League players
China League Two players
Chinese expatriate sportspeople in Serbia
Expatriate footballers in Serbia